Stella Grigoryan (born on November 4, 1989 in Aragatsavan) is an Armenian artist, sculptor, teacher.

Career 
Stella Grigoryan was born in 1989 in Aragatsavan, Aragatsotn Province of Armenia. From 2010 -2014 she studied at  sculpture department of Yerevan State Academy of Fine Arts. She got her master's degree from State Pedagogical University after Kh. Abovyan. Since 2016 Stella teaches at the "Mughdusyan" Art Center.

Exhibitions 
 Youth competition in 2013
 "Bronze and volume", 2013
 Exhibition-competition dedicated to the feast of St. Sargis, 2014
 Republican Sculpture Exhibition, 2014
 Exhibition dedicated to Armenian Genocide- «After 100 years», 2015

Awards 
 St. Sargis Award, 2015
 St. Sargis Award, 2016
 Art Fest 2016 international youth festival, for best sculptural work
 Armenian Genocide 100th anniversary of "The past in present" contest-winning exhibition

Gallery

See also
List of Armenian artists
List of Armenians
Culture of Armenia

References

External links
 Stella Grigoryan

1989 births
Armenian sculptors
Living people
21st-century Armenian women artists